Adélaïde Victoire Hall, called Adèle (11 May 1772 – 14 October 1844), was a Swedish-French artist and noble (marquise). She was given the honorary title of agré of the Royal Swedish Academy of Arts (1793).

Hall was born in Paris, the daughter of the Swedish artist painter of the royal French court Peter Adolf Hall and his wife Marie-Adélaïde Gobin. She was married in 1792 to the lawyer of the royal council, Francois Louis Seleau, who was murdered during the September Massacres the same year, and to the officer Blaise Lievre de la Grange, marquess de Fourilles in 1796.

Her self-portrait in oil was shown to the Royal Academy of Arts in Stockholm in 1791. She was furthermore represented with her work at the art exhibitions of the academy in 1792 and 1793. She was also a miniaturist and painted on wood and porcelain cups. She died in  Paris, aged 72.

Her self-portrait is kept at the Nationalmuseum in Sweden.

References 
  Svenskt konstnärslexikon (Swedish Art dictionary) Allhems Förlag, Malmö (1952) 

1772 births
1844 deaths
Members of the Royal Swedish Academy of Arts
18th-century French painters
19th-century French painters
French women painters
French people of Swedish descent
Rococo painters
French portrait painters
Portrait miniaturists
French marchionesses
Painters from Paris
19th-century French women artists
18th-century French women artists